Paul Graetz (8 August 1889 – 16 February 1937) was a German actor and star of the Weimar cabaret.

Partial filmography
 The Peruvian (1919) - Sonnenschein - spekulant
 Die Gelbe Fratze (1919) - Buckliger
 Der Doppelmord von Sarajewo (1920) - Javrilo Princip
 Mary Magdalene (1920) - Der alte Schneider
 Pension Lautenschlag (1920) - Paukenschläger
 The Princess of the Nile (1920) - Thobin
 The Marriage of Figaro (1920) - Bassillo
 Sumurun (1920) - Pufti, 2nd Servant of Nur-al-Djin
 Sehnsucht (1920)
 Christian Wahnschaffe (1920)
 Die Beichte einer Toten (1920) - Kritiker
 The House on the Moon (1921) - Kornill - Schauspieler
 The Wild Cat (1921) - Zofano
 Aus dem Schwarzbuch eines Polizeikommissars (1921, part 2)
 Your Bad Reputation (1922)
 She and the Three (1922) - Der Regisseur
 Monna Vanna (1922) - Gennezzano
 Die Fledermaus (1923) - Botenjunge
 Resurrection (1923)
 Tragedy of Love (1923)
 The Countess of Paris (1923)
 A Woman, an Animal, a Diamond (1923)
 I.N.R.I. (1923) - Jairus
 Debit and Credit (1924) - Veitel Itzig
 Doctor Wislizenus (1924) - Iltis
 The Man in the Saddle (1945) - Manager
 The Woman in Gold (1926)
 Three Cuckoo Clocks (1926) - Hotel Manager
 The Three Mannequins (1926) - Lagerist Meyer
 Kissing Is No Sin (1926) - Paul Polizzer
 Les voleurs de gloire (1926)
 Department Store Princess (1926)
 A Crazy Night (1927) - Pille, Apotheker in Essig an der Gurke
 The Impostor (1927) - Juwelier
 The Pink Slippers (1927) - Sally Löwenherz
 The Champion of the World (1927)
 The Indiscreet Woman (1927) - Noel
 The Great Leap (1927) - Paule
 Moral (1928) - Polizeischreiber Reisacher
 Sixteen Daughters and No Father (1928)
 Struggle for the Matterhorn (1928) - Luc Meynet - der Bucklige
 Trust of Thieves (1929) - Einbrecher
 The Veil Dancer (1929)
 Vienna, City of Song (1930) - Piefke, Reisender aus Berlin
 Two Worlds (1930) - Schumacher Mendel
 Mary (1931) - Bobby Brown
 Das gelbe Haus des King-Fu (1931) - Phlegmatiker
 Gesangverein Sorgenfrei (1931) - Paul
 Mountains on Fire (1931)
 Red Wagon (1933) - Max Schultze
 The Scotland Yard Mystery (1934) - Isaac Frenton (uncredited)
 Blossom Time (1934) - Alois Wimpassinger
 Jew Süss (1934) - Landauer
 Murder at Monte Carlo (1935) - Dr. Heinrich Becker
 Mimi (1935) - Durand
 18 Minutes (1935) - Pietro
 Bulldog Jack (1935) - Salvini
 Heart's Desire (1935) - Florian
 Mr. Cohen Takes a Walk (1935) - Jake Cohen
 Car of Dreams (1935) - Mr. Hart
 Public Enemy's Wife (1936) - Mr. Schultz - Tailor (uncredited)
 Hot Money (1936) - Dr. David
 Bengal Tiger (1936) - Carl Homan
 Isle of Fury (1936) - Captain Deever
 Black Legion (1937) - Minor Role (deleted scenes) (final film role)

References

External links
 
 Paul Graetz as Diener Paul

1889 births
1937 deaths
People from Głogów
People from the Province of Silesia
German male film actors
German male silent film actors
Male actors from Berlin
Jewish emigrants from Nazi Germany to the United Kingdom
20th-century German male actors
German emigrants to England
German emigrants to the United States